Akarsh Khurana is an Indian director, writer and actor, son of actor Akash Khurana, who is critically acclaimed for writing and directing various shows. His notable works are TVF Tripling (as a writer), Yeh Meri Family (actor), Mismatched (as a director) and Krrish (as a supporting screenplay writer).

Biography
He started his career in the entertainment sector from the film Museum Ke Andar Phans Gaya Sikandar(a dubbed version of Night at the Museum).

In September 2020, He started a new company Troika Productions along with his brother Adhaar Khurana.

Along with web series and films he performs in theaters as well.

As of May 2021, he is working on new sports drama film Rashmi Rocket which stars Tapsee Pannu.

Films and web series

References

External links

Living people
Hindi-language film directors
21st-century Indian film directors
Indian male film actors
Year of birth missing (living people)